Gymnopilus mesosporus is a species of mushroom in the family Hymenogastraceae.

See also

List of Gymnopilus species

External links
Gymnopilus mesosporus at Index Fungorum

mesosporus
Fungi of North America